Santa Fé de Goiás is a municipality in west-central Goiás state, Brazil.

Location
Santa Fé is located almost directly west of Brasília and northwest of Goiânia.  The nearest town of any size is Jussara, which lies 34 km. to the southeast.
Distance to regional center (Goiás Velho):  132 km.
Highway connections:  GO-060 / Trindade / GO-326 / Anicuns / Sanclerlândia / Novo Brasil / Jussara / BR-070 / Nova Trindade / GO-173.

Neighboring municipalities:  Jussara, Britânia, Itapirapuã

Political Information
Mayor: Ademar Marques de Carvalho (January 2005)
City council: 09
Eligible voters: 3,885 (December/2007)

In 1957 Santa Fé de Goiás became a district belonging to Goiás.  In 1958 it was dismembered to become a district in the municipality of Jussara.  In 1988 it got its municipal autonomy.

Demographic Information
Population density: 3.96 inhabitants/km2 (2007)
Urban population: 3,514 (2007)
Rural population: 1,080 (2007)
Population growth: a gain of about 900 people since 1991

Economic Information
The economy is based on subsistence agriculture, cattle raising, services, public administration, and small transformation industries.  
Industrial units: 6 (2007) 
Commercial units: 57 (2007)
Meat-packing plant: Frigorífico Arantes Ltda
Cattle herd: 135,000 head 
Main crops: cotton, rice, sugarcane, bananas, sesame seeds, corn, and soybeans.
Motor vehicles:  231 automobiles, 34 trucks, and 37 pickup trucks (2007)

Education (2006)
Schools: 5
Classrooms: 30
Teachers: 60
Students: 1,314
Higher education: none
Adult literacy rate: 83.7% (2000) (national average was 86.4%)

Health (2003)
Hospitals: 0
Hospital beds: 0
Ambulatory clinics: 2
Doctors, nurses, dentists: 3, 1, 1 (2002)
Infant mortality rate: 26.34 (2000) (national average was 33.0)
MHDI:  0.713
State ranking:  190 (out of 242 municipalities)
National ranking:  2,744 (out of 5,507 municipalities)

See also 
List of municipalities in Goiás
Microregions of Goiás

References

Frigoletto

Municipalities in Goiás